Ayipettai is a village in the Chidambaram taluk in the Indian state of Tamil Nadu.  It has a population of nearly 1000 people.

External links
http://wikimapia.org/10691099/Ayipettai
http://ourvillageindia.org/Place.aspx?PID=486355

Villages in Cuddalore district